Brandwood End Cemetery is a cemetery located in the Brandwood ward of Birmingham, England.

History
Until the early 19th century the Church of England church yards and burial grounds were the only major places available for burials.  By that time these ancient burial grounds were becoming overcrowded, causing the burials to become shallower and the graveyards to be considered as unsanitary health hazards.  Added to this was the massive increase in the population, particularly in the expanding urban industrial areas, which increased the demand for burial space.  The situation was further exacerbated by the increased death rate during periodic epidemics such as cholera, occurring unchecked within these overcrowded urban environments.

These burial problems were resolved with the development of ‘public cemeteries for all’. This was initially not under the direction of local or central government, but under Joint Stock Companies for profit.  For example, Key Hill Cemetery in Birmingham's Jewellery Quarter, founded in 1834, was a local example of such a Joint Stock venture.

However, these efforts by private enterprise could not, by themselves, solve the overall problem, and as a direct result of the cholera epidemics of 1831-1832 and 1848-1849 central government had to take action.  Between 1852 and 1857 a series of Burial Acts were passed, which established a national system of public cemeteries under the direction of local Burial Boards. These Boards were responsible for the interment of the dead; could build and manage new cemeteries; and, charge the expenses to the Poor Rate.

In the late 19th century, King's Norton Rural District Council was one of the largest administrative districts surrounding Birmingham. As Birmingham expanded in the 1880s and its population increasingly settled in this parish due to the new rail and tram routes, it created increasing pressure on the existing church burial grounds.  These, like others across the country, were full and unable to expand.  To resolve this problem using the new legislation, the Kings Norton RDC resolved to establish a cemetery, in the north of the district where population growth was greatest, but experienced some difficulty in finding a suitable site.

In 1892, the first plan was to build a cemetery in Billesley, in the parish of Yardley, but this was abandoned due to objections by the Yardley authorities to the scheme. In 1895, an area of farmland was finally acquired for the purpose of building a new cemetery in Brandwood End, near Kings Heath, within the parish of Kings Norton.

Brandwood End Cemetery was therefore one of the later Victorian Cemeteries, and was formally opened on 13 April 1899, by Mr George Tallis, the Chairman of the Local Cemetery Committee; the cemetery being subsequently incorporated within the City of Birmingham in 1911, under the Greater Birmingham Act, when the city expanded its boundaries.

The two semi-detached mortuary chapels stand at the highest point in the cemetery grounds, and provide a dramatic central focus for the cemetery.  The chapels are joined by a carriage entrance archway (a ), which is surmounted by a tower and spire. The twin chapels were designed by Mr J. Brewin Holmes, a Birmingham architect, and are built in the Gothic style with Art Nouveau details from red brick and terracotta. The mortuary chapel on the east was for Non-conformists and the chapel on the west consecrated for Anglican services. The chapels are mirror images of each other, containing: a chancel, a coffin chamber, a vestry and an underground heating chamber. There is also a Cemetery Lodge, built from red brick and terracotta, which contained the cemetery offices and living quarters for the cemetery Superintendent.

The plans for the original cemetery, drawn up by the Birmingham District Surveyor, are a classic example of the Victorian grid plan design for a cemetery.  It contained a grand tree lined central driveway running north to south through the cemetery ground, and passing beneath the carriageway arch between the two mortuary chapels.  There are subsidiary pathways which run in an east to west direction, at right angles to the grand central driveway, and which divide the cemetery into its various Sections.  Later extensions to the cemetery grounds: to the west in 1915; to the east in 1917, 1920 and 1950; and two further purchases of small parcels of ground in 1967 and 1996, continued to follow this original grid plan maintaining the original Victorian lay out.

The landscape was a very important aspect in the design of a Victorian cemetery, and Brandwood End was planted with a mixture of evergreen and deciduous trees which were popular in that period. Evergreens are concentrated within the original area of land obtained in 1885, and consist of avenues of: Scots pines; Cypress trees; and, Wellingtonia.  The dark green foliage was deliberately planted to present a striking contrast to the red terracotta chapels. The deciduous planting included Horse-Chestnut, Beech, Hornbeam and Poplar, which were added to existing Oak trees.

While this was a cemetery for everyone, the most impressive funerary monuments are those grouped around the mortuary chapels, where the local ‘great and the good’ purchased their grave plots.  These illustrate a range of early twentieth century styles including Edwardian Italian marble angels and the Art Deco memorials of the 1930s.

In 1929, a ‘Cross of Sacrifice' was erected in the main central driveway to commemorate those who died in the First World War, and below this, to the east of the drive, a Memorial Garden was laid out in 1952, in memory of the Civilian War dead from the Second World War who are buried in this cemetery. There are in all 206 British Commonwealth service war graves (108 from the First World War, 98 from the Second) in this cemetery, besides 2 Polish war graves.

For the local historian all these ‘new’ Victorian cemeteries, whether privately or publicly constructed, are not simply a new style of burial grounds constructed to answer a burial problem, but a reflection of the attitude of our Victorian and Edwardian predecessors to death, and their cherished memory of the departed.

It is from this 'culture of commemoration' we gain these beautifully landscaped cemeteries, with their Gothic buildings and funerary monuments which are now treasured open spaces within our 21st century urban environment.  Many of these Victorian cemeteries, including Brandwood End Cemetery are contained within English Heritage's, National Register of Parks and Gardens of Special Historic Interest in England, and many of the Victorian cemetery buildings are contained within the Statutory List of Buildings of Special Architectural or Historic Interest.

Brandwood End Cemetery is listed as Grade II in both the above registers reflecting its historical value.

It has been named by the Victorian Society as a heritage building at risk of disrepair.

Notable interments
 Aldrman John Bowen JP (1844–1926)
 Sidney Meteyard (1868–1947), artist
 Patrick Waite (1968–1993), musician of reggae pop group Musical Youth
 Ursula O'Leary (1926–1993), actress

Friends
The Friends of Brandwood End Cemetery (FBEC) arose from community interest in maintaining this historic landscaped Victorian Cemetery, which is also a valued green open space within an urban setting. The group officially commenced its activities following an inaugural meeting on 21 July 2005, when its Constitution was agreed and an Executive Committee elected by a well attended public meeting.

It has the full non-political support of the local Birmingham City Councillors for the area and is a registered charity, number 1114333.

The objectives of The Friends are: to promote for the benefit of the local community and others, the restoration, conservation and respectful enjoyment of Brandwood End Cemetery and Chapels, including monuments, buildings, records, green spaces, adjacent pool and allotments and overall environment.

In June 2011, it was announced that comedian Alistair McGowan, who has over 30 members of his extended family interred at Brandwood, had become a Patron of the friends.

References

 In The Midst of Life – A History of the Burial Grounds of Birmingham, Joseph McKenna, Birmingham Library Services, 1992, 
 "A Short History of Brandwood End Cemetery", Barrie Simpson, 2005

External links

 Birmingham City Council page
 Friends of Brandwood End Cemetery
 parks & Gardens UK (details of National Register of Parks and Gardens of Special Historic Interest in England entry)

Cemeteries in Birmingham, West Midlands
Grade II listed buildings in the West Midlands (county)
1899 establishments in England
Anglican cemeteries in the United Kingdom
Art Nouveau architecture in England
Art Nouveau cemeteries